Semelangulus is a genus of bivalves belonging to the subfamily Moerellinae of the family Tellinidae.

Species
 Semelangulus boucheti M. Huber, Langleit & Kreipl, 2015
 Semelangulus brazieri (G. B. Sowerby II, 1869)
 Semelangulus ellicensis (Hedley, 1899)
 Semelangulus fijiensis (G. B. Sowerby II, 1868)
 Semelangulus lacrimadugongi Kato & Ohsuga, 2007
 Semelangulus liratus M. Huber, Langleit & Kreipl, 2015
 Semelangulus mesodesmoides P. G. Oliver & Zuschin, 2000
 Semelangulus miyatensis (Yokoyama, 1920)
 Semelangulus nebulosus Dall, Bartsch & Rehder, 1938
 Semelangulus parvulus (Bertin, 1878)
 Semelangulus rosamunda (Melvill & Standen, 1907)
 Semelangulus tenuiliratus (G. B. Sowerby II, 1867)
 Semelangulus tokubeii Habe, 1961
 Semelangulus vincentianus (Tate, 1891)
Synonyms
 Semelangulus adamsi M. Huber, Langleit & Kreipl, 2015: synonym of Jactellina adamsi (M. Huber, Langleit & Kreipl, 2015) (original combination)
 Semelangulus crebrimaculatus (G. B. Sowerby II, 1868): synonym of Cadella crebrimaculata (G. B. Sowerby II, 1868)
 Semelangulus dichrous Dall, Bartsch & Rehder, 1938: synonym of Semelangulus fijiensis (G. B. Sowerby II, 1868)
 Semelangulus diodorus Dall, Bartsch & Rehder, 1938: synonym of Semelangulus fijiensis (G. B. Sowerby II, 1868)
 Semelangulus lilium (Hanley, 1844): synonym of Sylvanus lilium (Hanley, 1844)
 Semelangulus oahusensis Dall, Bartsch & Rehder, 1938: synonym of Semelangulus fijiensis (G. B. Sowerby II, 1868)
 Semelangulus semitorta (G. B. Sowerby II, 1867): synonym of Semelangulus tenuiliratus (G. B. Sowerby II, 1867)
 Semelangulus unifasciatus (G.B. Sowerby II, 1867): synonym of Nitidotellina unifasciata (G. B. Sowerby II, 1867)

References

External links
 T. (1924). Results from Roy Bell's molluscan collections. Proceedings of the Linnean Society of New South Wales. 49(3): 179-278

Tellinidae
Bivalve genera